Francesco Giacobbe (born 10 July 1958) is an Italian-Australian politician from  the Democratic Party. As of 2014 he served as member of the Senate of Italy.

References

1958 births
Living people
Politicians from Catania
Members of the Senate of the Republic (Italy)
Democratic Party (Italy) politicians
21st-century Italian politicians